Bathylaconidae is a former family of marine smelts found in deep oceanic waters. This family is now included in Alepocephalidae.

References

Alepocephalidae